The following is a list of notable deaths in October 1996.

Entries for each day are listed alphabetically by surname. A typical entry lists information in the following sequence:
 Name, age, country of citizenship at birth, subsequent country of citizenship (if applicable), reason for notability, cause of death (if known), and reference.

October 1996

1
James Beal, 67, New Zealand boxer, leukaemia.
Carl Fredrik Engelstad, 80, Norwegian writer, playwright, journalist, translator and theatre director.
Patrick Jameson, 83, New Zealand Royal Air Force officer and flying ace during World War II.
Pat McGeown, 40, Irish Provisional Irish Republican Army member, heart attack.
Fred Meyer, 86, American gymnast.
Herbert Seifert, 89, German mathematician.
Bill Twomey, Jr., 69, Australian rules football player.
Alfred Vogel, 93, Swiss herbalist, naturopath and writer.
Deng Yuzhi, 96, Chinese activist and feminist.

2
Helmut Artzinger, 84, German politician.
Robert Bourassa, 63, Canadian politician from Quebec, melanoma.
Peter J. Brennan, 78, American labor activist and politician, lymphatic cancer.
Joonas Kokkonen, 74, Finnish composer.
Emiel van Lennep, 83, Dutch diplomat and politician.
Andrey Lukanov, 58, Bulgarian politician, assassinated.
Banjo Matthews, 64, American NASCAR driver, car owner and builder, heart and respiratory disease.
Les Tietje, 86, American Major League Baseball player (Chicago White Sox, St. Louis Browns).
Rufus Youngblood, 72, United States Secret Service agent, cancer.

3
Ilyas Afandiyev, 82, Soviet/Azerbaijani writer.
Bertus Enklaar, 52, Dutch chess International Master.
Vivienne Goonewardene, 80, Sri Lankan politician.
George Kubler, 84, American art historian.
Eustace Roskill, Baron Roskill, 85, British lawyer and public servant.
István Serényi, 85, Hungarian handball player.

4
Humphrey Atkins, 74, British politician, cancer.
Larry Gene Bell, 46, American murderer and convict, execution by electrocution.
Stephen J. Friedman, 59, American film producer, multiple myeloma.
Joe Hoerner, 59, American baseball player, farming accident.
Masaki Kobayashi, 80, Japanese film director, heart attack.
Silvio Piola, 83, Italian football player.
Jerry Rivers, 68, American fiddle player, cancer.
Alma Routsong, 71, American novelist, ovarian cancer.
Randy Schultz, 52, American gridiron football player.

5
Judith Allen, 85, American film actress.
Elmer Berger, American Jewish rabbi and anti-Zionist.
Wymberley D. Coerr, 1995, American politician and diplomat.
Seymour Cray, 71, American computer scientist, car accident.
Duanmu Hongliang, 84, Chinese author.
Richard Kröll, 28, Austrian alpine skier, traffic collision.
Akira Noguchi, 79, Japanese baseball player and manager.
Arnold van Mill, 75, Dutch opera singer.

6
Jessie Bernard, 93, American sociologist and feminist, cancer.
Ted Bessell, 61, American actor (That Girl, Gomer Pyle, U.S.M.C.) and television director (The Tracey Ullman Show), aortic aneurysm.
Ted Daffan, 84, American country musician.
Winifred Drinkwater, 83, Scottish aviator and aeroplane engineer.
Forrest Pogue, 84, United States Army historian during World War II.
Marjorie Shostak, 51, American anthropologist, cancer.
Wolfram von Soden, 88, German Assyriologist.
Vladimir Yerokhin, 66, Russian football player.

7
José Antonio Burciaga, 55/56, American Chicano artist, poet, and writer.
Dame Diana Reader Harris, 83, English head master and public figure.
Viktor Reimann, 81, Austrian author, journalist and politician.
Andrew Salter, 82, American psychologist, cancer.
Zeya, 80, Burmese actor and bodybuilder.

8
Mignon G. Eberhart, 97, American author of mystery novels.
Geoffrey Finsberg, 70, British politician.
Francis D. Lyon, 91, American film and television director.
David Miller, 70,  Canadian ice hockey player and Olympian.
Ferdinand Montier, 87, French racing driver.
William Prince, 83, American actor.

9
Per Asplin, 68, Norwegian actor and musician.
Marland P. Billings, 94, American structural geologist.
William L. DeAndrea, 44, American writer.
Nigel Fisher, 83, British politician.
George F. Kerr, 78, English writer.
Walter Kerr, 83, American writer and theatre critic, congestive heart failure.
John W. King, 79, American politician.
Roy Lewis, 82, English writer and small press printer.
Colleen Peterson, 45, Canadian country and folk singer, cancer.
Aleksandar Popović, 66, Serbian writer.
Harvey Vernon, 69, American actor.
Harry D. Yates, 93, American banker and politician.

10
Harold Cleghorn, 83, New Zealand weightlifter.
Coya Knutson, 84, American politician.
Bob Reynolds, 57, American gridiron football player.
Toshio Sugie, 83, Japanese film director.
David Viscott, 58, American psychiatrist, author, and media personality, heart failure complicated by diabetes.

11
Lars Ahlfors, 89, Finnish mathematician, pneumonia.
Keith Boyce, 53, Barbadian cricketer.
Carlos Mancheno Cajas, 94, President of Ecuador.
Eleanor Cameron, 84, Canadian-American children's author and critic.
Johnny Costa, 74, American jazz pianist, aplastic anemia, anemia.
Bernardo Grinspun, 70, Argentinian politician.
Roger Lapébie, 85, French racing cyclist.
Joe Morris, 83, Canadian trade unionist.
Terry Patchett, 56, British politician, cancer.
Edith Penrose, 81, American-British economist.
Renato Russo, 36, Brazilian singer and songwriter, complications caused by AIDS.
Edwin Spanier, 75, American mathematician at the University of California at Berkeley, working in algebraic topology.
William Vickrey, 82, Canadian economist, Nobel prize winner, heart failure.
Rolf Widerøe, 94, Norwegian accelerator physicist.
Gerald Wild, 89, Australian politician.

12
Nina Alisova, 80, Soviet/Russian actress.
Erik Blomberg, 83, Finnish cinematographer, screenwriter, film director and producer.
Mac Holten, 74, Australian politician and sportsman.
Helmut Hölzer, 84, German rocket engineer.
Stefan Knapp, 75, Polish painter and sculptor.
Eddie Kuzma, 85, American auto racing builder.
René Lacoste, 92, French tennis champion and businessman, cancer.
Jack Robertson, 79, English cricket player.
Gerard Thoolen, 53, Dutch actor, AIDS.

13
Carl H. Dodd, 71, United States Army soldier and a recipient of the Medal of Honor.
Horst Kopkow, 85, German Nazi politician and  SS officer, pneumonia.
Henri Nannen, 82, German journalist.
Beryl Reid, 77, English actress, kidney failure.
Brad Robinson, 37-38, Australian rock musician, lymphoma.

14
Rex Darling, 82, American football, basketball, and tennis coach.
William John Hooper, 80, British cartoonist.
Václav Hovorka, 65, Czech football player.
Ferd Johnson, 90, American comic strip cartoonist.
Tan Chee Khoon, 77, Malaysian politician.
Laura La Plante, 91, American film actress, Alzheimer's disease.
Izidor Papo, 82, Yugoslav general.

15
Mike Balas, 86, American Major League Baseball player.
Leo Eitinger, 83, Czech psychiatrist.
Tom Ferrick, 81, American Major League Baseball player, pitching coach and scout, heart failure.
Pierre Franey, 75, French chef, stroke.
Toma Tomas, 72, Iraqi guerilla and politician.
Jean Adeline Morgan Wanatee, 85, Native American and women's rights activist.
Robert F. Williams, 71, American civil rights leader and author, Hodgkin's lymphoma.

16
Peter Brodie, 79, Scottish minister.
Guy Crescent, 76, French businessman and founder of Paris Saint-Germain F.C.
Gertrude Flynn, 87, American actress.
Anthony Griffin, 75, British admiral.
Eric Malpass, 85, English novelist.
Harold J. Powers, 96, American politician.
Hunter Rouse, 90, American physicist.
Huang Shao-ku, 95, Chinese politician, Vice Premier.

17
Chris Acland, 30, English drummer and songwriter, suicide by hanging.
Bob Adams, 95, American baseball player and coach.
Jaroslav Balík, 72, Czechoslovak film director and screenwriter.
Berthold Goldschmidt, 93, German-British Jewish composer.
Bert Hopwood, British motorcycle designer.
Laura Sabia, 80, Canadian social activist and feminist, Parkinson's disease.

18
Jason Bernard, 58, American actor (Herman's Head, WarGames, Bird), heart attack.
Louise Bertram, 88, Canadian figure skater.
Luciano Durán Böger, 91, Bolivian poet, writer and politician.
Hans Drachsler, 80, German politician.
Elmer Klumpp, 90, American Major League Baseball player.
Alex Motter, 83, Canadian ice hockey player.
Simon Soloveychik, 66, Soviet/Russian writer and philosopher.
Sheldon Vanauken, 82, American journalist, lung cancer.

19
Josef Becker, 91, German politician.
Maurice Elliott, 53, Scottish footballer, brain haemorrhage.
Ralston Hill, 69, American actor and singer.
John Hillaby, 79, British travel writer and explorer.
Bobby Rackard, 69, Irish hurler.
Shamsuddin Qasemi, 61, Bangladeshi Islamic scholar and politician.

20
Robert Benayoun, 75, French film critic and author.
J. Bracken Lee, 97, American politician.
Sebastian Santa Maria, 37, Chilean composer.
Yuri Neprintsev, 87, Soviet/Russian, painter, graphic artist and art teacher.
Richard M. Powell, 79, American screenwriter, prostate cancer.
Luigi Rovere, 88, Italian film producer.

21
Léon Ashkenazi, 74, Jewish spiritual leader, philosopher and educator.
Eric Halsall, 76, English author and television presenter.
Albert G. Hill, 86, American physcisist and pioneer in the development of radar.
Wang Li, 74, Chinese politician, pancreatic cancer.
Les Mead, 87, Australian rugby player and coach.
Allie White, 81, American gridiron football player.
Georgios Zoitakis, 86, Greek Army general and regent of Greece.
Giovanni Zuddas, 68, Italian boxer.

22
John Bauldie, 47, British journalist, helicopter crash.
Edmund Black, 91, American Olympic athlete.
Kathy Change, 46, Chinese-American political activist, writer, and performance artist, self-immolation.
Shmarya Guttman, 87, Israeli archaeologist.
Matthew Harding, 42, British businessman, helicopter crash.
Dianne Heatherington, 48, Canadian rock singer and businesswoman, ovarian cancer.
Noel Hilliard, 67, New Zealand novelist.
Hermann Höfer, 62, German football player.
Sten Rudberg, 79, Swedish geologist and geomorphologist.

23
Henry Allard, 84, Swedish politician.
Chet Blaylock, 71, American politician, heart attack.
Kurt Freund, 82, Czech-Canadian physician and sexologist, suicide.
Bob Grim, 66, American Major League Baseball player, heart attack.
Harold Hughes, 74, American politician.
Michel Kelber, 87–88, French cinematographer.
Lin Onus, 47, Australian artist of Scottish-Aboriginal origins.
Diana Trilling, 91, American literary critic and author.

24
Robert Anderson, 60, New Zealand politician, cancer.
Artur Axmann, 83, Nazi German Hitler Youth leader.
Roderick Barclay, 87, British diplomat and ambassador.
Gladwyn Jebb, 96, British civil servant, diplomat and politician.
Hyman Minsky, 77, American economist.
Romica Puceanu, 69, Romanian singer.
Joe Spencer, 73, American gridiron football player and coach, cancer.

25
Ennio De Giorgi, 68, Italian mathematician.
Solveig Gunbjørg Jacobsen, 83, First person born on South Georgia.
Maria Litto, 77, German ballet dancer, choreographer and film actress.
Robert Racic, 32, Australian DJ and record producer, brain virus.
Harry Shuman, 81, American Major League Baseball player.
Brian Stacey, 49, Australian conductor.
Roland Wilson, 92, Australian public servant and economist.

26
Miquel Asins Arbó, 80, Spanish composer.
Aurelio Chessa, 82, Italian anarchist, journalist and historian.
Abdelhamid ben Hadouga, 71, Algerian writer.
Hans W. Kosterlitz, 93, German-British biochemist.
Henri Lepage, 88, French fencer.
Derek Tangye, 84, British writer.
Sofia Tuibayeva, 83, Soviet/Tajikistani actress.
Wendy Wild, 40, American singer, musician, and artist, breast cancer.

27
Henry Piet Drury van Asch, 85, New Zealand aviator and surveyor.
Rewat Buddhinan, 48, Thai singer and music producer, brain cancer.
Charlotte Jay, 76, Australian mystery writer and novelist.
Marcello Mihalich, 89, Italian football player and manager.
Arthur Tremblay, 79, Canadian politician.

28
Morey Amsterdam, 87, American actor and comedian, heart attack.
Reuben Baetz, 73, Canadian politician.
Irene Cortes, 75, Filipino lawyer, Associate Justice of the Supreme Court.
Jimmy Haig, 71, Scottish-New Zealand rugby player.
Robert Hankey, 2nd Baron Hankey, 91, British diplomat and public servant.
Karol Jokl, 51, Slovak football player and manager.
Joe Samuels, 91, American baseball player.
Sheldon Vanauken, 82, American journalist, lung cancer.

29
Ewell Blackwell, 74, American Major League Baseball player.
J. Edward Day, 82, American lawyer and United States Postmaster General, heart attack.
Richard Duffin, 87, American physicist.
Eugen Kapp, 88, Estonian composer and music educator.
Robert Levin, 84, Norwegian classical pianist and composer.
Christophe Munzihirwa, 70, Congo catholic prelate and Archbishop of Bukavu, murdered.
Ralph Vince, 96, American gridiron football player (Cleveland Indians, Cleveland Bulldogs, Cleveland Panthers).

30
John Barnum, 85, American golfer.
Roberto Belangero, 68, Brazilian football player.
John Matthew Cannella, 88, American federal judge.
Eleanor Lansing Dulles, 101, American author, professor, and state official.
George R. E. Shell, 88, United States Marine Corps brigadier general.
John Young, 80, Scottish actor.

31
Louise Bates Ames, 92, American psychologist.
Marcel Carné, 90, French film director.
Peter Doig, 85, British politician.
Frank Kurtz, 85, American Olympic diver and aviator, complications following a fall.
Arthur Peterson, Jr., 83, American actor, Alzheimer's disease.
William Rosenwald, 93, American businessman and philanthropist.

References 

1996-10
 10